MGL may refer to:

the International Olympic Committee code for Mongolia, see Mongolia at the Olympics
Missionaries of God's Love, a Roman Catholic religious congregation
IATA airport code for Mönchengladbach Airport
ICAO code for MIAT Mongolian Airlines
General Laws of Massachusetts, also known as Massachusetts General Laws
Monoacylglycerol lipase, a human protein
Multiple grenade launcher, such as the Milkor MGL
Multiple granularity locking, a method for locking in databases